The 1923 Campeonato Carioca, the eighteenth edition of that championship, kicked off on April 15, 1923 and ended on October 14, 1923. It was organized by LMDT (Liga Metropolitana de Desportos Terrestres, or Metropolitan Land Sports League). Sixteen teams participated. Vasco da Gama won the title for the 1st time. No teams were relegated.

Participating teams

System 
The tournament would be disputed in two stages:

 First stage: The sixteen teams would be divided into two groups of eight : Série A, with the teams that had finished from 1st to 8th in the previous year's championship, and Série B, with those that had finished from 9th to 14th and the two teams promoted from the Second level. The teams in each group played each other in a double round-robin format. The champions of Série A and Série B would qualify into the Finals, while the last-placed team in Série B would dispute a playoff against the champions of the Second Level.
 Final stage: However, before the Finals, the champions of Série B would have to play against the last-placed team of Série A. If they won that match, they qualified for the Finals while the other team would be relegated to the Série B. In case of any other result, the Série A champions would win the title automatically, and no relegation or promotion across groups would take place.

Championship

Série A

Série B

Playoffs

Final phase 

Villa Isabel eliminated; Vasco da Gama declared champions

Final standings

Relegation Playoffs 
The regulation stipulated that a playoff would be held between Americano, the last-placed team in Série B and Hellênico, the champions of the Second Level. Hellênico won the playoff. Americano would have been relegated, but after the subsequent split between LMDT and AMEA, Americano participated in the 1924 LMDT championship anyway.

References 

Campeonato Carioca seasons
Carioca